Matthias Schweighöfer (born 11 March 1981) is a German actor and filmmaker.

Early life
Born in Anklam, Western Pomerania, Schweighöfer attended Berlin's renowned acting school Ernst Busch Academy of Dramatic Arts, but dropped out after one year. Nevertheless, the son of actors had already worked with established directors such as Peter Greenaway.

Career
His first role in a feature film was Raus aus der Haut (1997), directed by Andreas Dresen. In the following years, he appeared in projects such as Soloalbum (2003), Off Beat (2004), Eight Miles High (2007) and Rabbit Without Ears.  portrayed Lieutenant-Colonel Franz Herber in Valkyrie, a 2008 film dramatizing the failed 20 July assassination and political coup plot to kill Adolf Hitler. The international release of Valkyrie and the all-star cast (including Tom Cruise, Kenneth Branagh, Terence Stamp and Bill Nighy) not only allowed Schweighöfer to be recognized abroad, it provided an opportunity for him to be cast in other English speaking roles.

In 2009, Schweighöfer founded the fashion label German Garment with TV presenter Joko Winterscheidt.

In 2010, he made his debut as film director with the romantic comedy What a Man, followed in 2013 by his second movie . In 2017, he directed, produced and played the lead role in You Are Wanted, Amazon Studios' first non-English-language TV series.

In 2021, Schweighöfer appeared in the Netflix film Army of the Dead, directed by Zack Snyder, as Ludwig Dieter. He reprised his role in the prequel film, Army of Thieves, which he also directed.

In 2021/2022, he took on the role of real-life music producer Frank Farian in the biopic Girl You Know It's True about the scandalous pop duo Milli Vanilli, written and directed by Simon Verhoeven, produced by Wiedemann & Berg Film. The film is set to be released theatrically by Leonine in 2023.

Personal life
Between 2004 and 2012, Schweighöfer dated Ani Schromm, and they got together again in the summer of 2013. They have a daughter born in 2009 and a son born in 2014. Schweighöfer and Schromm later separated, and as of 2019 Schweighöfer has been in a relationship with his Army of Thieves co-star Ruby O. Fee. Schweighöfer currently lives in Berlin.

Awards 

 2000: German Television Prize – Promotional Award for the performance in 
 2002: Günter Strack TV Award – Best Young Actor for the performance in 
 2003: Golden Camera – "Curt Jürgens Memorial Camera" for best newcomer and performances in Friends of Friends & 
 2003:  – For the performance in Friends of Friends
 2003: New Faces Award – Best Actor
 2004: Bavarian Film Award – Best Young Actor
 2005: Undine Award – Best Young Actor (TV) for the performance in 
 2007: Undine Award – Best Young Actor (feature film) for the performance in Eight Miles High
 2007: Bambi Award – Film – National – Male
 2009: Golden Camera – Best German Actor for the performance in The Author of Himself: The Life of Marcel Reich-Ranicki
 2010: Jupiter Award – Best Male Actor (TV) for his performance in The Author of Himself: The Life of Marcel Reich-Ranicki
 2011: GQ Man of the Year – Film National

Selected filmography 
Director

Actor

 1999: Dr. Stefan Frank, season 4, episode 10, als Ingo
 2000: Trust Me, as Speedy
 2001:  (Herz im Kopf), as Dirk
 2002:  (Nachts im Park), as Hansen
 2002:  (TV film), as Gregor
 2002: FeardotCom, as Dieter Schrader
 2003: Soloalbum, as Ben
 2003: , as Felix
 2004: Baal (TV film), as Baal
 2004:  (TV film), as Ben
 2004: Off Beat, as Crash
 2004: Gold – The Tulse Luper Suitcases
 2005: Schiller (TV film), as 
 2005: , as Ronny Helske
 2006: Lulu (TV film), as Jack the Ripper
 2007: Eight Miles High, as Rainer Langhans
 2007:  (TV film), as Felix
 2007: Fata Morgana, as Daniel
 2007: Rabbit Without Ears, as Moritz
 2008: The Red Baron, as Manfred von Richthofen
 2008: , as Jan Winter
 2008: Valkyrie, as Lieutenant Herber
 2009:  (TV film), as Marcel Reich-Ranicki
 2009: Night Train, as Frankie
 2009: 12 Paces Without a Head, as Gottfried Michaelsen
 2009: Rabbit Without Ears 2, as Moritz
 2010: Friendship!, as Tom
 2011: What a Man, as Alex Nowak
 2011: , as Alexander Honk
 2012: Russian Disco, as Wladimir
 2013: , as Paul Voigt
 2013: Frau Ella, as Sascha
 2013: Kokowääh 2, as himself
 2014: Joy of Fatherhood, as Felix
 2015: The Little Prince, as the Fox (German version)
 2015: The Manny, as Clemens
 2016: The Most Beautiful Day, as Andi
 2016: Vier gegen die Bank, as Max
 2017: The Price, as Jonas
 2017: You Are Wanted (TV series), as Lukas Franke
 2018: Hot Dog, as Theo
 2018: Vielmachglas, as Erik Ruge
 2018: , as Toni Katz
 2018: Kursk
 2019: Playmobil: The Movie, as Rex Dasher (German version)
 2020: Resistance, as Klaus Barbie
 2021: Army of the Dead, as Ludwig Dieter
 2021: Army of Thieves, as Ludwig Dieter/Sebastian Schlencht-Wöhnert 
 2022: The Swimmers as Sven
 2022: Hinterland as Josef Severin
 2023: Oppenheimer as Werner Heisenberg
 2023: Heart of Stone
 TBA: Girl You Know It’s True

Theatre
 2004: One, Two, Three – Otto Ludwig Pfiffl, Hebbel Theatre, Berlin
 2007: North, directed by Frank Castorf, Berlin

Audiobooks 
 2008: Slam by Nick Hornby, 
 2008: Die Traumnovelle by Arthur Schnitzler,

References

External links 
 
 Matthias Schweighöfer at the German Dubbing Card Index
 Matthias Schweighöfer at Players Agency
 Schweighöfer at german-films.de
 Rubbeldiekatz Videointerview 

1981 births
Living people
German film directors
German male film actors
German male television actors
German male voice actors
People from Anklam
21st-century German male actors